James Peckham (c. 1346 – 1400) was an English politician.

Life
Peckham was the eldest son of John and Ellen Peckham of Yaldham, near Wrotham, Kent. His first wife was named Margery. At some point by December 1376, he was married to the widow Lora Morant, the sole daughter and heir of Sir Thomas Morant, of Morant's Court, Chevening and widow of Sir Thomas Cawne. She brought him, among other estates, the manor of Barsted, near Borough Green, in Wrotham. He had two legitimate daughters and an acknowledged illegitimate son, John Wrotham. He is recorded as helpful to his stepchildren, Robert and Alice Couen, the children of his second wife Lora.

Career
In 1377, he was poll tax collector for Kent.

Peckham was Member of Parliament for Kent 1372, October 1377, February 1383, February 1388,
and September 1388.

He was appointed Sheriff of Kent in 1380 and 1389.

References

1400 deaths
English MPs 1372
1346 births
English MPs October 1377
High Sheriffs of Kent
English MPs February 1383
English MPs February 1388
English MPs September 1388
People from Wrotham